Demineralization - it is the opposite process of mineralization, a process to reduce the content of mineral substances in tissue or organism, such as bone demineralization, of teeth. Demineralization can lead to serious diseases such as osteoporosis or tooth decay.

Usually, treatment involves administration of appropriate dietary supplements to help restore the remineralization of human tissues and their physiological state.

References

Physiology